This is a list of league seasons played by Bolton Wanderers Football Club in English and European football, from 1888 to the current season. The club was founded in 1874 by the Reverend John Farrall Wright.

The club has won the FA Cup four times and the Charity Shield once. They have competed in the UEFA Cup on two occasions.

Key

Key to league record:
P = Played
W = Games won
D = Games drawn
L = Games lost
F = Goals for
A = Goals against
Pts = Points
Pos = Final position

Key to divisions:
Prem = Premier League
FL = The Football League
Div 1 = Football League First Division
Div 2 = Football League Second Division
Div 3 = Football League Third Division
Div 4 = Football League Fourth Division
n/a = Not applicable

Key to rounds:
DNE = Did not enter
PR = Preliminary round
R1 = Round 1
R2 = Round 2
R3 = Round 3
R4 = Round 4
R5 = Round 5

Grp = Group stage
QF = Quarter-finals
NQF = Northern Quarter-finals
SF = Semi-finals
NF = Northern final
RU = Runners-up
W = Winners

Division shown in bold to indicate a change in division.
Top scorers shown in bold are players who were also top scorers in their division that season.

Seasons

 Seasons spent at Level 1 of the football league system: 73
 Seasons spent at Level 2 of the football league system: 34
 Seasons spent at Level 3 of the football league system: 13
 Seasons spent at Level 4 of the football league system: 2

Notes

References

Seasons
 
Bolton Wanderers F.C.